Boston Spa is a village and civil parish in the City of Leeds metropolitan borough in West Yorkshire, England. According to the 2001 census, the parish had a population of 4,006 rising to 4,079 in the 2011 census.

It sits in the Wetherby ward of Leeds City Council and Elmet and Rothwell parliamentary constituency.

Etymology
The origin of Boston Spa's name is not entirely clear; the name is not attested prior to appearing on printed maps in 1771, when it was labelled Thorp Spaw. At this stage, then, the name Thorp Spaw presumably meant 'the spa associated with Thorp Arch' (the nearest pre-existing settlement). The Boston element of the name is first attested in 1799 as Bostongate and then in 1822 simply as Boston. It is thought probable that Boston was the surname of a local family, whose name itself derives from Boston, Lincolnshire, and that their name was given to the settlement that grew up around the spa.

History

The Boston Spa hoard, a Romano-British coin hoard dating to the mid second-century AD and comprising a grey ware vessel and 172 silver denarii, was found in the town in 1848.

In 1744, John Shires established a spa town when he discovered sulphur springs in the magnesian limestone. It was known as Thorp Spa but declined when Harrogate became very popular as a spa town.

In 1753, a turnpike was built on the Tadcaster to Otley road, which passes through Boston Spa. In the same year, Joseph Taite built a house to accommodate visitors that became the Royal Hotel, which is still standing, but converted into flats and shops. By 1819, Boston Spa had a population of more than 600, and several inns and other houses offering accommodation had been built. Spa baths were built to allow visitors to take the waters. On the north bank of the river is the village of Thorp Arch, which predates Boston Spa by several centuries.

The Boston Spa and Thorp Arch Conservation Area, designated in 1969, extended across both Boston Spa and Thorp Arch parishes. It was revised in 2009, restricting the boundaries to Boston Spa parish and reshaped to exclude areas of late-20th-century estate housing to the south of the High Street. The current conservation area boundary focuses on the historic settlement. It was extended to the west, to encompass West End, an area of dwellings constructed during the Second World War to house workers from Thorp Arch munitions factory. The war had a major effect on Boston Spa's population, society and surroundings, and the buildings stand as a testament to that history.

Governance 
When Boston Spa was founded in 1744 it was in the township of Clifford in the old parish of Bramham, in the upper division of the wapentake of Barkston Ash, in the West Riding of Yorkshire. From 1866 to 1896, it was part of the civil parish of Clifford with Boston, and became a separate civil parish in 1896. The parish was in Wetherby Rural District in the West Riding of Yorkshire until 1974, when it was transferred to the City of Leeds in the new county of West Yorkshire.

Amenities

Boston Spa has a post office, a small library and a filling station. There are three public houses, (the Admiral Hawke and the Fox and Hounds both owned by Samuel Smiths Old Brewery) and the Crown Hotel on the high street owned by an independent group of investors, a small Costcutter supermarket in the former Royal Hotel and several independent retailers in the village centre (a butcher, hardware shop and several takeaway restaurants).

The Crown Hotel closed in 2012 and was subject to a public inquiry as to its future use. Arguments presented in 2014 by Tesco that the premises "had little or no use as a hotel facility" were accepted at appeal.

This branch contains almost the complete British Library newspaper collection.

There are two churches St Mary's Anglican Church and Boston Spa Methodist Church.

Education

There are three primary schools in the village: Primrose Lane Primary School, St Edward's Catholic Primary School and St Mary's CE Primary School.

Close by, in the parish of Clifford, is Boston Spa Academy, the local secondary school taking pupils from areas which also feed comprehensives in Wetherby, Garforth and Pendas Fields. The school has success in sports and science teaching, and caters for pupils undertaking GCSEs, A levels, GNVQs and those with special needs according to its Ofsted reports.

Other educational establishments with postal addresses of Boston Spa, although sited in the nearby parish of Clifford, include the children's hospice Martin House and St John's Catholic School for the Deaf which has a UK-wide catchment.

Housing

Boston Spa has a mix of private and council houses. Most of the council housing is situated around Clifford Moor Road and Wickham Avenue. The east side of Boston Spa comprises mainly larger houses. There are many Georgian villas and town houses on High Street.

Events
The village annual gala is held in June. Since 2009 a beer festival takes place in the village hall.
The village hall has hosted a nationally renowned weekly jazz night since January 2005 and an annual arts festival usually in October.

Recreation
The route of The White Rose Way, a long-distance walk from Leeds to Scarborough, North Yorkshire passes through the village. As does the Ebor Way which passes over the river at Thorp Arch village before continuing towards Tadcaster.

Gallery

See also
Listed buildings in Boston Spa

References

External links 

 British Library
 British Library Document Supply Service 
 Boston Spa School
 Performing Arts School based in Boston Spa
 Martin House Hospice
 St John's Catholic School for the Deaf
 Photos of Boston Spa
 St Mary The Virgin Church
 Boston Spa Parish Council
 Just For Fun Theatre Group
 
Boston Spa Arts Festival
Jazz in the Spa

 
Places in Leeds
Villages in West Yorkshire
Spa towns in England
Populated places established in 1744
Civil parishes in West Yorkshire
1744 establishments in England